Howard Andrew "Hobby" Hobson (July 4, 1903 – June 9, 1991) was an American basketball player and coach of football, basketball, and baseball.  He served as the head basketball coach at Southern Oregon Normal School—now Southern Oregon University—from 1932 to 1935, at the University of Oregon from 1935 to 1944 and again from 1945 to 1947, and at Yale University from 1947 to 1956, compiling a career college basketball record of 401–257.  Hobson's 1938–39 Oregon basketball team won the inaugural NCAA basketball tournament.  Hobson authored numerous books on the subject of basketball.  He was also the head football coach at Southern Oregon for 1932 to 1934, tallying a mark of 12–7–1, and the head baseball coach at Oregon from 1936 to 1947, amassing a record of 167–75–1.  Hobson was inducted into the Naismith Memorial Basketball Hall of Fame as a coach in 1965.

Playing career
Hobson played basketball for four years at Franklin High School in Portland, Oregon, from which he graduated in 1922. During his time there, he was team captain for two years, and led the state championship-winning team in 1921. 

He was captain of the University of Oregon's basketball team from 1924 to 1926, and in 1925, his team tied Oregon State for the Pacific Coast Conference title. However, they lost in the playoffs.  A year later, the team won the conference title, but lost to the California in the playoffs. This 1926 team was nevertheless undefeated in the conference, with a win record of 10–0. In the same year, he graduated from the University with a bachelor's degree. He went on to obtain a master's degree in 1929 and a doctorate in 1945, both from Columbia University.

Coaching career
Hobson began his coaching career at Kelso High School in Kelso, Washington in 1928, where his team won the league championship. In 1929, he was the head football coach at the Cortland Normal School, now known as State University of New York College at Cortland. From 1930 to 1932, he coached Benson High School in Portland. They won the championship in his final year there. Hobson subsequently led  Southern Oregon Normal School to three consecutive league championship victories from 1933 to 1935.

In 1936, Hobson took over as head basketball coach of the University of Oregon Ducks, leading them to three consecutive Pacific Coast Conference titles from 1937 to 1939, culminating in the first-ever NCAA basketball championship in 1939. His 1939 team was known as the "Tall Firs" because of their size: the players averaged about six feet in height, which was considered very tall for a basketball player at the time.

Hobson coached Oregon's basketball and baseball teams from 1936 to 1947, when he left to coach basketball at Yale University. He coached at Yale until 1956, during which time his teams won or shared five Big Three crowns (in 1948, 1949, 1951, 1953, and 1956). The 1949 team was the first NCAA Tournament entry in the school's history and won the Eastern Intercollegiate Basketball League title for the first time in 16 years.

Legacy
Hobson was the first coach to win championships at a major college level on both coasts. He also pioneered intersectional play at Oregon, making the Ducks the first Western team to travel East for games. He repeated this type of intersectional play at Yale, and the 1948–49 team was the first Yale team to appear on the Pacific Coast. His overall record for 27 years as a coach was 495–291.

In 1947, Hobson was named President of the National Association of Basketball Coaches (NABC). For 12 years, he was also a member of the U.S. Olympic Basketball Committee. He served four years as a member and treasurer of the National Basketball Rules Committee and conducted basketball clinics in the U.S. and in 15 foreign countries. On October 13, 1965, Howard Hobson was enshrined as a coach in the Naismith Memorial Basketball Hall of Fame, having also been inducted into the Portland High School, Helms Foundation, Oregon Sports Hall of Fame, and Portland Metro Hall of Fame.

In 1988, he attended the 50th anniversary celebration of the founding of the NCAA Tournament.  Hobson died on June 9, 1991.

Head coaching record

College basketball

College football

See also
 List of NCAA Division I Men's Final Four appearances by coach

References

 NCAA, NCAA March Madness: Cinderellas, Superstars, and Champions from the NCAA Men's Final Four Chicago: Triumph Books, 2004.

Further reading
 Hobson, Howard A. Shooting Ducks: A History of University of Oregon Basketball Portland: Western Imprints/Oregon Historical Society Press, 1984.

External links
 
 

1903 births
1991 deaths
American men's basketball coaches
American men's basketball players
Basketball coaches from Oregon
Basketball players from Portland, Oregon
College men's basketball head coaches in the United States
Columbia University alumni
Cortland Red Dragons football coaches
Franklin High School (Portland, Oregon) alumni
High school basketball coaches in Washington (state)
High school football coaches in Washington (state)
Naismith Memorial Basketball Hall of Fame inductees
Oregon Ducks baseball coaches
Oregon Ducks men's basketball coaches
Oregon Ducks men's basketball players
Southern Oregon Raiders football coaches
Southern Oregon Raiders men's basketball coaches
Sportspeople from Portland, Oregon
Yale Bulldogs men's basketball coaches